"Love in Portofino" is a 1958 song by Italian writing duo Chiosso-Buscaglione, first sang by the latter one. Her version achieved sales success in the European market, spawning dozens of covers. Embraced by musical intellectuals as masterpiece of Dalida's early repertoire of 1950s, it eventually became the symbolic song for Portofino, to which it is referring.

Background 

Italian lyricist Leo Chiosso wrote the song in 1958. It was mostly in Italian, only the repeating verse "I found my love in Portofino" was in English. Song's composer Fred Buscaglione was the first one to record the song.

French lyricist Jacques Larue soon discovered the song and adapted it wholly in French, titled "A San Cristina". It was immediately recorded by a few French singers, with no success.

It was then when Eddie Barclay noticed the song and got it for Dalida. But in collaboration with Larue, the French part was rewritten and reduced to minimum, just as an addition to original Italian and English lyrics that were kept. "Love in Portofino" became a trilingual song, and under this version it became famous. It was recorded during Dalida's 1959 summer tour pause, under orchestra conduction of Raymond Lefèvre, and was published first on the EP (Barclay – 70 271). It was also featured as a title song of her end of year album.

In Hungarian at the Radio Novi Sad Yugoslavia (now Serbia) by Mira Gubik.

Charts

Other recordings 

Johnny Dorelli in 1959, Andrea Bocelli in 2013, and many more.

See also 
Dalida discography

References

External links 
  at Discogs
 Official website

Songs about cities
Songs about Italy
Dalida songs
1959 songs
Italian songs
French songs